The Invisible Man's Revenge is a 1944 American horror film directed by Ford Beebe and written by Bertram Millhauser. The film stars John Carradine as a scientist who tests his experiment on Jon Hall, a psychiatric hospital escapee who takes the invisibility serum and then goes on a crime spree. The film was announced on June 10, 1943, and began shooting on January 10, 1944 finishing in mid-February. On its release, reviews in  The New York Herald-Tribune, The New York Daily News and The New York World-Telegram noted that the film series and its special effects became tired, while a review in The Hollywood Reporter declared it as one of the best in the series.

Plot
After murdering two orderlies, Robert Griffin escapes from the secluded Cape Town mental institution where he has been committed, and now he is looking for revenge on the respectable Herrick family. A family consisting of Sir Jasper and lady Irene, and their daughter Julie, who are engaged in entertaining, and inspecting, Julie's new boyfriend, newspaper journalist Mark Foster, in the family residence. Later that night Julie and Mark leave the residence together, and Sir Jasper and lady Irene are left alone. That's when Robert decides to pay the couple a visit. Quite unexpectedly he enters the residence and accuses the couple of leaving him to die out in the African wild, injured when they were on a safari together. The Herrick couple defends themselves, claiming they were told that he was dead and not injured, but Robert doesn't buy their explanation. He demands they give him his share of the diamond fields they all discovered together on the safari. Jasper tries to tell Robert that the diamond fields were all lost in a series of bad investments. Robert refuses to give in, threatening to sue the Herricks, and to calm him down and get him off their backs, they offer him a share in an estate, the Shortlands. His counter-proposal is that they should arrange for him to be married to their daughter Julie. After saying this, he is drugged by Lady Irene and passes out in their home. The Herricks realize that their old friend and companion has gone completely mad, and while they are frightened of what he could do to them if they don't comply to his wish, they see no problem with stealing the agreement made or pushing him further along the path of insanity with their betrayal. They search Robert's clothes and find the written partnership agreement they all entered into some time ago. Taking the paper, they next callously throw Robert out of their house. Robert nearly drowns where he lies, unconscious, but is saved by a local Cockney cobbler by the name of Herbert Higgins.

Herbert decides to use this newfound possibility - the information he got from Robert - to blackmail the Herricks. He is unsuccessful, as Jasper calls on chief constable Sir Frederick Travers. The chief constable declares Robert's claims to the Herricks' estate as void and orders him to leave his jurisdiction. Robert leaves for London, but on his way he happens to come by the home of eager scientist Dr. Peter Drury. This scientist is involved in some questionable research, and is very eager to find a suitable subject to test his new experimental formula on - a formula for invisibility. Robert asks that the doctor try it on him, and he agrees, completely in the dark of the fact that Robert wants to use this to get his revenge on the Herricks. Robert forces Jasper to sign over their entire estate to him. He also finds time to help his saviour Herbert to win a game of darts at the local inn. Jasper secretly also agrees to give his daughter's hand in marriage to Robert - if he ever regains his visibility. Robert goes back to the scientists laboratory and witnesses how the doctor restores visibility to his dog Brutus, by giving him a blood transfusion. Robert breaks into the laboratory and knocks the doctor unconscious, before performing a blood transfusion on himself, using the doctor's blood. The transfusion results in the doctor's death, and to avoid capture, Robert sets the laboratory on fire and takes off just before the police arrive on the scene.

Robert changes his identity to "Martin Field" and moves in with the Herricks at the estate which he is now owner of. When Herbert finds out about Robert's return he makes a futile attempt to blackmail him too, and out of pity - and perhaps thankfulness - Robert pays the man one thousand pounds to get rid of him. Robert has one condition for paying the money: that Herbert kills the doctor's dog Brutus, who has followed Robert back to the Herrick estate after the fire. Robert starts losing his visibility one day at the breakfast table, with Julie and her fiancé Mark present. He tricks Mark to follow him down into the wine cellar, where he knocks the man out, starting another, second blood transfusion with Mark's blood. Chief Constable Travers arrives at the estate after he has found out about Robert's return. With some help from Herbert and Jasper they break into the cellar just as the transfusion is about to be completed, in time to save Mark's life. Robert is attacked by the still very much alive Brutus, and killed. Mark tells the others that Griffin went insane when he was locked up in the asylum, and meant no one any harm until he escaped.

Cast

Production
Universal first announced the plan for The Invisible Man's Revenge on June 10, 1943 with the hopes of having Claude Rains performing in the lead. Other cast members who were lined up for the film were Edgar Barrier who opted out of the production on January 6, after being disenchanted with the roles he had in films like Phantom of the Opera and Cobra Woman.

Jon Hall had also played an Invisible Man character for Universal in Invisible Agent (1942), two years before this film.  

Prior to the first day of shooting the film, Universal's attorneys made a deal with H. G. Wells for the rights to make two more Invisible Man sequels between July 1943 and October 1951. Production on the film began on January 10, 1944 and continued for five weeks and three days finishing in mid-February. After this, John P. Fulton took over to complete the special effects sequences. The film's final cost was $314,790.

Release
The Invisible Man's Revenge was distributed theatrically by the Universal Pictures Company on June 9, 1944. The film's worldwide gross was $765,700. The film was released on DVD on as part of the "Invisible Man: The Legacy Collection" set, which included The Invisible Man, The Invisible Man Returns, The Invisible Woman and Invisible Agent. It was released again on blu ray as part of the "Invisible Man: The Complete Legacy Collection" on August 28, 2018.

Reception
From contemporary reviews, Howard Barnes of The New York Herald-Tribune found the film "singularly unexciting" finding John Fulton's special photography as "the most striking aspect of the picture [but] the tricks have been done too often before by the camera to make them particularly effective by themselves". Wanda Hale of The New York Daily News echoed this statement, finding that "the frightening creature  [...] is no novelty" and that the film was "not the stimulating thriller that The Invisible Man was". A reviewer in The New York World-Telegram declared that "some of the earlier variations of H.G. Wells' invisible man idea were filmed with an idea that the story should make good sense. That policy has been abandoned this time" while still noting that Jon Hall was being "a much more effective actor than he has been in some of his recent adventures in gaudy Technicolor". Conversely, a reviewer from The Hollywood Reporter declared it as one "of the best and most entertaining of the series".

From retrospective reviews, the authors of the book Universal Horrors declared the film to be "the least ambitious but hardly the least entertaining of Universal's widely varying series" noting its "no frills approach to its subject matter", declaring it better than The Invisible Woman and Invisible Agent but not as strong as The Invisible Man or The Invisible Man Returns. Special effects in the film were described as "have a slapdash quality" with only a few pulling of "startlingly effective tricks".

Actor John Carradine, who loathed the horror films he worked in, was asked in the British fanzine House of Hammer if he liked any of the horror films he was in, and he responded he enjoyed The Invisible Man's Revenge.

See also
 List of American films of 1944

References

Footnotes

Sources

External links

 
 
 
 
 

1944 films
1944 horror films
American black-and-white films
American science fiction horror films
Films about criminals
Films about invisibility
Films based on The Invisible Man
Films directed by Ford Beebe
Films scored by Hans J. Salter
Universal Pictures films
1940s American films